Ben Joseph Jones (5 August 1924 – 10 February 2005) was a Grenadian politician. He was a lawyer before being elected to Parliament as a member of the New National Party in 1984. In 1984 he began serving as foreign minister in the government of his party's leader, Herbert Blaize. When Blaize died in December 1989, Jones became prime minister of Grenada. He served until March 1990, when his party lost elections. He also gave up his position as foreign minister at that time, but was reappointed later that year. Though his party was out of power, Jones continued serving as foreign minister until 1991.

Biography
Jones was born in Carriere, Saint Andrew Parish, Grenada, and was educated at the Belair Presbyterian Primary School until 1943. During World War II he enlisted in the Windward Islands Battalion of the South Caribbean Force.

He subsequently worked in Aruba in the oil refineries for nine years, then in 1953 migrated to the United Kingdom, determined to study law. He eventually entered Gray's Inn and at the same time enrolled as an external student at the University of London. He was called to the Bar on 6 February 1962.

He returned to Grenada in 1964 to start a private law practice but the following year moved  into government service as a magistrate. In 1966, he was appointed Senior Assistant Secretary in the Ministry of External Affairs and was appointed Opposition Senator from 1967 to 1979.

In 1984, he was elected to the House of Representatives of Grenada, winning the St. Andrew's South West constituency under the New National Party (NNP). He served in Legal Affairs as Attorney General, and as Minister of External Affairs, Agriculture and Tourism.

He was deputy Prime Minister from 1984 to 1989, and, following the death of Herbert Blaize, was a short-term Prime Minister from December 1989 until March 1990. He was finance minister simultaneously. He succeeded Blaize as the leader of the newly formed National Party. He resumed his private practice in 1991.

Popularly known as "Uncle Ben", Jones died in his sleep at his home in Carriere, St. Andrew's, at the age of 80, and was given a state funeral.

References

External links
 Hugh O'Shaughnessy, "Ben Jones - Wily but unassuming prime minister of Grenada" (obituary), The Independent, 3 March 2005.
 "Tributes to Ben Joseph Jones", Grenada Informer, 19 February 2005.

1924 births
2005 deaths
Prime Ministers of Grenada
Deputy Prime Ministers of Grenada
Finance ministers of Grenada
Foreign ministers of Grenada
Agriculture ministers of Grenada
Tourism ministers of Grenada
Members of the House of Representatives of Grenada
New National Party (Grenada) politicians
20th-century Grenadian lawyers
British Army personnel of World War II
Alumni of University of London Worldwide
People from Saint Andrew Parish, Grenada
Grenadian expatriates in the United Kingdom
20th-century Grenadian politicians